Dzurilla is a surname. Notable people with the surname include:

Vladimír Dzurilla (1942–1995), Slovak ice hockey player
William T. Dzurilla (born 1953), American lawyer